Ahmadabad (also Romanized as Aḩmadābād) is a village in Golmakan Rural District, Golbajar District, Chenaran County, Razavi Khorasan Province, Iran. At the 2006 census, its population was 505, in 130 families.

See also 

 List of cities, towns and villages in Razavi Khorasan Province

References 

Populated places in Chenaran County